A Kinetic Heap is a kinetic data structure, obtained by the kinetization of a heap. It is designed to store elements (keys associated with priorities) where the priority is changing as a continuous function of time. As a type of kinetic priority queue, it maintains the maximum priority element stored in it. 
This heap property is enforced using certificates along every edge so, like other kinetic data structures, a kinetic heap also contains a priority queue (the event queue) to maintain certificate failure times.

Implementation and operations 
If the value stored at a node  is a function  of time, then this certificate is only valid while . Thus, the failure of this certificate must be scheduled in the event queue at a time  such that .

All certificate failures are scheduled on the "event queue", which is assumed to be an efficient priority queue whose operations take  time.

Dealing with certificate failures 

Thus, assuming non-degeneracy of the events (no two events happen at the same time), only a constant number of events need to be de-scheduled and re-scheduled even in the worst case.

Operations 
A kinetic heap supports the following operations:

 : create an empty kinetic heap 
 : insert a key  into the kinetic heap at the current virtual time , whose value changes as a continuous function  of time . The insertion is done as in a normal heap in  time, but  certificates might need to be changed as a result, so the total time for rescheduling certificate failures is  
  delete a key  at the current virtual time .

Performance 
Kinetic heaps perform well according to the four metrics (responsiveness, locality, compactness and efficiency) of kinetic data structure quality defined by Basch et al. The analysis of the first three qualities is straightforward:

 Responsiveness: A kinetic heap is responsive, since each certificate failure causes the concerned keys to be swapped and leads to only few certificates being replaced in the worst case.
 Locality: Each node is present in one certificate each along with its parent node and two child nodes (if present), meaning that each node can be involved in a total of three scheduled events in the worst case, thus kinetic heaps are local.
 Compactness: Each edge in the heap corresponds to exactly one scheduled event, therefore the number of scheduled events is exactly  where  is the number of nodes in the kinetic heap. Thus, kinetic heaps are compact.

Analysis of efficiency 
The efficiency of a kinetic heap in the general case is largely unknown. However, in the special case of affine motion  of the priorities, kinetic heaps are known to be very efficient.

Affine motion, no insertions or deletions 

Affine motion, with insertions and deletions 

Variants 
This article deals with "simple" kinetic heaps as described above, but other variants have been developed for specialized applications, such as:

 Fibonacci kinetic heap
 Incremental kinetic heap

Other heap-like kinetic priority queues are:

 Kinetic heater
 Kinetic hanger

References 

Kinetic data structures
Heaps (data structures)